Carlos Ignacio Ramos Rodríguez (born 26 May 1999) is a Venezuelan footballer who plays as a midfielder for Deportivo Táchira.

Career statistics

Club

Notes

References

1999 births
Living people
Venezuelan footballers
Venezuela under-20 international footballers
Association football midfielders
Venezuelan Primera División players
Carabobo F.C. players
Deportivo Táchira F.C. players
Sportspeople from Valencia, Venezuela
21st-century Venezuelan people